is Japanese voice actress and singer Maaya Uchida's 12th single, released on May 12, 2021. The titular song from the single was used as the ending theme for the anime SSSS.Dynazenon.

Track listings

Charts

Event 
 『 Maaya Party！12』　Maaya Uchida 12th Single Release Event「Maaya Party！12」（May 22, 2021 - May 23, 2021：Online）

Album

References

2021 singles
2021 songs
J-pop songs
Japanese-language songs
Pony Canyon singles
Anime songs